The Hollywood blacklist was an entertainment industry blacklist, broader than just Hollywood, put in effect in the mid-20th century in the United States during the early years of the Cold War. The blacklist involved the practice of denying employment to entertainment industry professionals believed to be or to have been Communists or sympathizers. Actors, screenwriters, directors, musicians, and other American entertainment professionals were barred from work by the studios.

This was usually done on the basis of their membership in, alleged membership in, or sympathy with the Communist Party USA, or on the basis of their refusal to assist Congressional investigations into the party's activities. Even during the period of its strictest enforcement, from the late 1940s through to the late 1950s, the blacklist was rarely made explicit or easily verifiable, as it was the result of numerous individual decisions by the studios and was not the result of official legal action. Nevertheless, it quickly and directly damaged or ended the careers and income of scores of individuals working in the film industry.

Hollywood Ten 
The first systematic Hollywood blacklist was instituted on November 25, 1947, the day after ten writers and directors were cited for contempt of Congress for refusing to testify before the House Un-American Activities Committee (HUAC). These people were subpoenaed to appear before HUAC in October. The contempt citation included a criminal charge, which led to a highly publicized trial and an eventual conviction with a maximum of one year in jail in addition to a $1,000 fine. The Congressional action prompted a group of studio executives, acting under the aegis of the Association of Motion Picture Producers, to fire the artists – the "Hollywood Ten" – and make what has become known as the Waldorf Statement. It was announced via a news release after the major producers met at the Waldorf-Astoria Hotel and it included a condemnation of the personalities involved, effectively ostracizing those named from the industry. These producers instituted compulsory oaths of loyalty from their employees with the threat of a blacklist.

Blacklist 
On June 22, 1950, a pamphlet entitled Red Channels was published. Focused on the field of broadcasting, it identified 151 entertainment industry professionals in the context of "Red Fascists and their sympathizers". Soon, most of those named, along with a host of other artists, were barred from employment in most of the entertainment field.

The blacklist lasted until 1960, when Dalton Trumbo, a Communist Party member from 1943 to 1948 
and member of the Hollywood Ten, was credited as the screenwriter of the film Exodus (1960), and publicly acknowledged by actor Kirk Douglas for writing the screenplay for Spartacus (also 1960). Many of those blacklisted, however, were still barred from work in their professions for years afterward.

History

Background
The Hollywood blacklist was rooted in events of the 1930s and the early 1940s, encompassing the height of the Great Depression and World War II. Two major film industry strikes during the 1930s increased tensions between the Hollywood producers and the unions, particularly the Screen Writers Guild.

The Communist Party USA (CPUSA) lost substantial support after the Moscow show trials of 1936–1938 and the Molotov–Ribbentrop Pact of 1939. The U.S. government began turning its attention to the possible links between Hollywood and the party during this period. Under then-chairman Martin Dies, Jr., the House Un-American Activities Committee (HUAC) released a report in 1938 claiming that communism was pervasive in Hollywood. Two years later, Dies privately took testimony from a former Communist Party member, John L. Leech, who named forty-two movie industry professionals as Communists. After Leech repeated his charges in supposed confidence to a Los Angeles grand jury, many of the names were reported in the press, including those of stars Humphrey Bogart, James Cagney, Katharine Hepburn, Melvyn Douglas and Fredric March, among other Hollywood figures. Dies said he would "clear" all those who co-operated by meeting with him in what he called "executive session". Within two weeks of the grand jury leak, all those on the list except for actress Jean Muir had met with the HUAC chairman. Dies "cleared" everyone except actor Lionel Stander, who was fired by the movie studio, Republic Pictures, where he was under contract.

In 1941, producer Walt Disney took out an ad in Variety, the industry trade magazine, declaring his conviction that "Communist agitation" was behind a cartoonists and animators' strike. According to historians Larry Ceplair and Steven Englund, "In actuality, the strike had resulted from Disney's overbearing paternalism, high-handedness, and insensitivity." Inspired by Disney, California State Senator Jack Tenney, chairman of the state legislature's Joint Fact-Finding Committee on Un-American Activities, launched an investigation of "Reds in movies". The probe fell flat, and was mocked in several Variety headlines.

The subsequent wartime alliance between the United States and the Soviet Union brought the CPUSA newfound credibility. During the war, membership in the party reached a peak of 50,000. As World War II drew to a close, perceptions changed again, with communism increasingly becoming a focus of American fears and hatred. In 1945, Gerald L. K. Smith, founder of the neofascist America First Party, began giving speeches in Los Angeles assailing the "alien minded Russian Jews in Hollywood". Mississippi congressman John E. Rankin, a member of HUAC, held a press conference to declare that "one of the most dangerous plots ever instigated for the overthrow of this Government has its headquarters in Hollywood ... the greatest hotbed of subversive activities in the United States". Rankin promised, "We're on the trail of the tarantula now". Reports of Soviet repression in Eastern and Central Europe in the war's aftermath added more fuel to what became known as the "Second Red Scare". The growth of conservative political influence and the Republican triumph in the 1946 Congressional elections, which saw the party take control of both the House and Senate, led to a major revival of institutional anticommunist activity, publicly spearheaded by HUAC. The following year, the Motion Picture Alliance for the Preservation of American Ideals (MPA), a political action group cofounded by Walt Disney, issued a pamphlet advising producers on the avoidance of "subtle communistic touches" in their films. Its counsel revolved around a list of ideological prohibitions, such as "Don't smear the free-enterprise system ... Don't smear industrialists ... Don't smear wealth ... Don't smear the profit motive ... Don't deify the 'common man' ... Don't glorify the collective".

Beginning (1946–1947)
On July 29, 1946, William R. Wilkerson, publisher and founder of The Hollywood Reporter, published a "TradeView" column entitled "A Vote For Joe Stalin". It named as Communist sympathizers Dalton Trumbo, Maurice Rapf, Lester Cole, Howard Koch, Harold Buchman, John Wexley, Ring Lardner Jr., Harold Salemson, Henry Meyers, Theodore Strauss, and John Howard Lawson. In August and September 1946, Wilkerson published other columns containing names of numerous purported Communists and sympathizers. They became known as "Billy's List" and "Billy's Blacklist". In 1962, when Wilkerson died, his THR obituary stated he had "named names, pseudonyms and card numbers and was widely credited with being chiefly responsible for preventing communists from becoming entrenched in Hollywood production – something that foreign film unions have been unable to do." In a 65th-anniversary article in 2012, Wilkerson's son apologized for the paper's role in the blacklist, stating that his father was motivated by revenge for his own thwarted ambition to own a studio.

In October 1947, drawing upon the list named in The Hollywood Reporter, the House Un-American Activities Committee subpoenaed a number of persons working in the Hollywood film industry to testify at hearings. The committee had declared its intention to investigate whether Communist agents and sympathizers had been planting propaganda in American films.

The hearings began with appearances by Walt Disney and Ronald Reagan, then president of the Screen Actors Guild. Disney testified that the threat of Communists in the film industry was a serious one, and named specific people who had worked for him as probable Communists. Reagan testified that a small clique within his union was using "communist-like tactics" in attempting to steer union policy, but that he did not know if those (unnamed) members were communists or not, and that in any case he thought the union had them under control. (Later his first wife, actress Jane Wyman, stated in her biography written with Joe Morella [1985] that Reagan's allegations against friends and colleagues led to tension in their marriage, eventually resulting in their divorce.) Actor Adolphe Menjou declared: "I am a witch hunter if the witches are Communists. I am a Red-baiter. I would like to see them all back in Russia."

In contrast, other leading Hollywood figures, including director John Huston and actors Humphrey Bogart, Lauren Bacall, Judy Garland and Danny Kaye, organized the Committee for the First Amendment to protest the government's targeting of the film industry. Members of the committee, such as Sterling Hayden, assured Bogart that they were not Communists. During the hearings, a local Washington paper reported that Hayden was a Communist. After returning to Hollywood, Bogart shouted at Danny Kaye, "You fuckers sold me out." The group came under attack as being naive or foolish. Under pressure from his studio, Warner Bros., to distance himself from the Hollywood Ten, Bogart negotiated a statement that did not denounce the committee, but said that his trip was "ill-advised, even foolish". Billy Wilder told the group that "we oughta fold".

Many of the film industry professionals in whom HUAC had expressed interest were alleged to have been members of the Communist Party USA. Of the 43 people put on the witness list, 19 declared that they would not give evidence. Eleven of these 19 were called before the committee. Members of the Committee for the First Amendment flew to Washington ahead of this climactic phase of the hearing, which commenced on Monday, October 27. Of the eleven "unfriendly witnesses", one, émigré playwright Bertolt Brecht, ultimately chose to answer the committee's questions (following which he left the country). The other ten refused, citing their First Amendment rights to freedom of speech and assembly. Included among the questions they refused to answer was one now generally rendered as "Are you now, or have you ever been, a member of the Communist Party?". The Committee formally accused these ten of contempt of Congress, and began criminal proceedings against them in the full House of Representatives.

In light of the "Hollywood Ten"'s defiance of HUAC – in addition to refusing to testify, many had tried to read statements decrying the committee's investigation as unconstitutional – political pressure mounted on the film industry to demonstrate its "anti-subversive" bona fides. Late in the hearings, Eric Johnston, president of the Association of Motion Picture Producers (AMPP) (and Motion Picture Association of America (MPAA)), declared to the committee that he would never "employ any proven or admitted Communist because they are just a disruptive force, and I don't want them around".

On November 17, the Screen Actors Guild voted to make its officers swear a pledge asserting each was not a Communist. The following week, on November 24, the House of Representatives voted 346 to 17 to approve citations against the Hollywood Ten for contempt of Congress. The next day, following a meeting of film industry executives at New York's Waldorf-Astoria hotel, AMPP President Johnston issued a press release that is today referred to as the Waldorf Statement. Their statement said that the ten would be fired or suspended without pay and not re-employed until they were cleared of contempt charges and had sworn that they were not Communists. The first Hollywood blacklist was in effect.

Growth (1948–1950)
The HUAC hearings failed to turn up any evidence that Hollywood was secretly disseminating Communist propaganda, but the industry was nonetheless transformed. The fallout from the inquiry was a factor in the decision by Floyd Odlum, the primary owner of RKO Pictures, to leave the industry. As a result, the studio passed into the hands of Howard Hughes. Within weeks of taking over in May 1948, Hughes fired most of RKO's employees and virtually shut the studio down for six months as he had the political sympathies of the rest investigated. Then, just as RKO swung back into production, Hughes made the decision to settle a long-standing federal antitrust suit against the industry's Big Five studios. This was one of the crucial steps in the collapse of the studio system that had governed Hollywood for a quarter-century.

In early 1948, all of the Hollywood Ten were convicted of contempt. Following a series of unsuccessful appeals, the cases arrived before the Supreme Court; among the submissions filed in defense of the ten was an amicus curiae brief signed by 204 Hollywood professionals. After the court denied review, the Hollywood Ten began serving one-year prison sentences in 1950. One of the Ten, screenwriter Dalton Trumbo, stated in the documentary film Hollywood On Trial (1976):

In September 1950, one of the Ten, director Edward Dmytryk, publicly announced that he had once been a Communist and was prepared to give evidence against others who had been as well. He was released early from jail; following his 1951 HUAC appearance, in which he described his brief membership in the party and named names, his career recovered.

The others remained silent and most were unable to obtain work in the American film and television industry for many years. Adrian Scott, who had produced four of Dmytryk's films – Murder, My Sweet; Cornered; So Well Remembered; and Crossfire – was one of those named by his former friend. Scott's next screen credit did not come until 1972 and he never produced another feature film. Some of those blacklisted continued to write for Hollywood or the broadcasting industry surreptitiously, using pseudonyms or the names of friends who posed as the actual writers (those who allowed their names to be used in this fashion were called "fronts"). Of the 204 who signed the amicus brief, 84 were themselves blacklisted. There was a more general chilling effect: Humphrey Bogart, who had been one of the most prominent members of the Committee for the First Amendment, felt compelled to write an article for Photoplay magazine denying he was a Communist sympathizer. The Tenney Committee, which had continued its state-level investigations, summoned songwriter Ira Gershwin to testify about his participation in the committee.

A number of non-governmental organizations participated in enforcing and expanding the blacklist; in particular, the American Legion, the conservative war veterans' group, was instrumental in pressuring the entertainment industry to exclude communists and their sympathizers. In 1949, the Americanism Division of the Legion issued its own blacklist – a roster of 128 people whom it claimed were participants in the "Communist Conspiracy". Among the names on the Legion's list was that of the playwright Lillian Hellman. Hellman had written or contributed to the screenplays of approximately ten motion pictures up to that point; she was not employed again by a Hollywood studio until 1966.

Another influential group was American Business Consultants Inc., founded in 1947. In the subscription information for its weekly publication Counterattack, "The Newsletter of Facts to Combat Communism", it declared that it was run by "a group of former FBI men. It has no affiliation whatsoever with any government agency." Notwithstanding that claim, it seems the editors of Counterattack had direct access to the files of both the Federal Bureau of Investigation and HUAC; the results of that access became widely apparent with the June 1950 publication of Red Channels. This Counterattack spinoff listed 151 people in entertainment and broadcast journalism, along with records of their involvement in what the pamphlet meant to be taken as Communist or pro-Communist activities. A few of those named, such as Hellman, were already being denied employment in the motion picture, TV, and radio fields; the publication of Red Channels meant that scores more were placed on the blacklist. That year, CBS instituted a loyalty oath which it required of all its employees.

Jean Muir was the first performer to lose employment because of a listing in Red Channels. In 1950, Muir was named as a Communist sympathizer in the pamphlet, and was immediately removed from the cast of the television sitcom The Aldrich Family, in which she had been cast as Mrs. Aldrich. NBC had received between 20 and 30 phone calls protesting her being in the show. General Foods, the sponsor, said that it would not sponsor programs in which "controversial persons" were featured. Though the company later received thousands of calls protesting the decision, it was not reversed.

HUAC return (1951–1952)
In 1951, with the U.S. Congress now under Democratic control, HUAC launched a second investigation of Hollywood and Communism. As actor Larry Parks said when called before the panel,

Don't present me with the choice of either being in contempt of this committee and going to jail or forcing me to really crawl through the mud to be an informer. For what purpose? I don't think it is a choice at all. I don't think this is really sportsmanlike. I don't think this is American. I don't think this is American justice.

Parks ultimately testified, becoming, however reluctantly, a "friendly witness", and found himself blacklisted, nonetheless.

In fact, the legal tactics of those refusing to testify had changed by this time; instead of relying on the First Amendment, they invoked the Fifth Amendment's shield against self-incrimination (although, as before, Communist Party membership was not illegal). While this usually allowed a witness to avoid "naming names" without being indicted for contempt of Congress, "taking the Fifth" before HUAC guaranteed one's membership on the industry blacklist. Historians at times distinguish between the relatively official blacklist – the names of those who (a) were called by HUAC and, in whatever manner, refused to co-operate and/or (b) were identified as Communists in the hearings – and the graylist – those others who were denied work because of their political or personal affiliations, real or imagined; the consequences, however, were largely the same. The graylist also refers more specifically to those who were denied work by the major studios, but could still find jobs on Poverty Row: Composer Elmer Bernstein, for instance, was called by HUAC when it was discovered that he had written some music reviews for a Communist newspaper. After he refused to name names, pointing out that he had never attended a Communist Party meeting, he found himself composing music for movies such as Cat Women of the Moon.

Like Parks and Dmytryk, others also co-operated with the committee. Some friendly witnesses gave broadly damaging testimony with less apparent reluctance, most prominently director Elia Kazan and screenwriter Budd Schulberg. Their co-operation in describing the political leanings of their friends and professional associates effectively brought a halt to dozens of careers and compelled a number of artists to depart for Mexico or Europe. Others were also forced abroad in order to work. Director Jules Dassin was among the best known of these. Briefly a Communist, Dassin had left the party in 1939. He was immediately blacklisted after Edward Dmytryk and fellow filmmaker Frank Tuttle named him to HUAC in 1952. Dassin left for France, and spent much of his remaining career in Greece. Scholar Thomas Doherty describes how the HUAC hearings swept onto the blacklist those who had never even been particularly active politically, let alone suspected of being Communists:
[O]n March 21, 1951, the name of the actor Lionel Stander was uttered by the actor Larry Parks during testimony before HUAC. "Do you know Lionel Stander?" committee counsel Frank S. Tavenner inquired. Parks replied he knew the man, but had no knowledge of his political affiliations. No more was said about Stander either by Parks or the committee – no accusation, no insinuation. Yet Stander's phone stopped ringing. Prior to Parks's testimony, Stander had worked on ten television shows in the previous 100 days. Afterwards, nothing.

When Stander was himself called before HUAC, he began by pledging his full support in the fight against "subversive" activities:
I know of a group of fanatics who are desperately trying to undermine the Constitution of the United States by depriving artists and others of Life, Liberty, and the Pursuit of Happiness without due process of law ... I can tell names and cite instances and I am one of the first victims of it ... [This is] a group of ex-Fascists and America-Firsters and anti-Semites, people who hate everybody, including Negroes, minority groups, and most likely themselves ... [T]hese people are engaged in a conspiracy outside all the legal processes to undermine the very fundamental American concepts upon which our entire system of democracy exists.
Stander was clearly speaking of the committee itself.

The hunt for subversives extended into every branch of the entertainment industry. In the field of animation, two studios in particular were affected: United Productions of America (UPA) was purged of a large portion of its staff, while New York-based Tempo was entirely crushed. HUAC investigations effectively destroyed families. Screenwriter Richard Collins, after a brief period on the blacklist, became a friendly witness and dumped his wife, actress Dorothy Comingore, who refused to name names. Divorcing Comingore, Collins took the couple's young son, as well. The family's story was later dramatized in the film Guilty by Suspicion (1991), in which the character based on Comingore "commits suicide rather than endure a long mental collapse". In real life, Comingore succumbed to alcoholism and died of a pulmonary disease at the age of fifty-eight. In the description of historians Paul Buhle and David Wagner, "premature strokes and heart attacks were fairly common [among blacklistees], along with heavy drinking as a form of suicide on the installment plan".

For all that, evidence that Communists were actually using Hollywood films as vehicles for subversion remained hard to come by. Schulberg reported that the manuscript of his novel What Makes Sammy Run? (later a screenplay, as well) had been subject to an ideological critique by Hollywood Ten writer John Howard Lawson, whose comments he had solicited. The significance of such interactions was questionable. As historian Gerald Horne describes, many Hollywood screenwriters had joined or associated with the local Communist Party chapter because it "offered a collective to a profession that was enmeshed in tremendous isolation at the typewriter. Their 'Writers' Clinic' had 'an informal "board" of respected screenwriters' – including Lawson and Ring Lardner Jr. – 'who read and commented upon any screenplay submitted to them. Although their criticism could be plentiful, stinging, and (sometimes) politically dogmatic, the author was entirely free to accept it or reject it as he or she pleased without incurring the slightest "consequence" or sanction.'" Much of the onscreen evidence of Communist influence uncovered by HUAC was feeble at best. One witness remembered Stander, while performing in a film, whistling the left-wing "Internationale" as his character waited for an elevator. "Another noted that screenwriter Lester Cole had inserted lines from a famous pro-Loyalist speech by La Pasionaria about it being 'better to die on your feet than to live on your knees' into a pep talk delivered by a football coach."

Others disagree about how Communists affected the film industry. The author Kenneth Billingsley, writing in Reason magazine, said that Trumbo wrote in The Daily Worker about films which he said communist influence in Hollywood had prevented from being made: among them were proposed adaptations of Arthur Koestler's anti-totalitarian works Darkness at Noon and The Yogi and the Commissar, which described the rise of communism in Russia. Authors Ronald and Allis Radosh, writing in Red Star over Hollywood: The Film Colony's Long Romance with the Left, said that Trumbo bragged about how he and other party members stopped anti-communist films from being produced.

Height (1952–1956)
In 1952, the Screen Writers Guild – which had been founded two decades before by three future members of the Hollywood Ten – authorized the movie studios to "omit from the screen" the names of any individuals who had failed to clear themselves before Congress. Writer Dalton Trumbo, for instance, one of the Hollywood Ten and still on the blacklist, had received screen credit in 1950 for writing, years earlier, the story on which the screenplay of Columbia Pictures' Emergency Wedding was based. There was no more of that until the 1960s. The name of Albert Maltz, who had written the original screenplay for The Robe in the mid-1940s, was nowhere to be seen when the movie was released in 1953.

As William O'Neill describes, pressure was maintained even on those who had ostensibly "cleared" themselves:

On December 27, 1952, the American Legion announced that it disapproved of a new film, Moulin Rouge, starring José Ferrer, who used to be no more progressive than hundreds of other actors and had already been grilled by HUAC. The picture itself was based on the life of Toulouse-Lautrec and was totally apolitical. Nine members of the Legion had picketed it anyway, giving rise to the controversy. By this time, people were not taking any chances. Ferrer immediately wired the Legion's national commander that he would be glad to join the veterans in their "fight against communism".

The group's efforts dragged many others onto the blacklist: In 1954, "[s]creenwriter Louis Pollock, a man without any known political views or associations, suddenly had his career yanked out from under him because the American Legion confused him with Louis Pollack, a California clothier, who had refused to co-operate with HUAC." Orson Bean recalled that he had briefly been placed on the blacklist after dating a member of the party, despite his own politics being conservative.

During this same period, a number of influential newspaper columnists covering the entertainment industry, including Walter Winchell, Hedda Hopper, Victor Riesel, Jack O'Brian, and George Sokolsky, regularly offered up names with the suggestion that they should be added to the blacklist. Actor John Ireland received an out-of-court settlement to end a 1954 lawsuit against the Young & Rubicam advertising agency, which had ordered him dropped from the lead role in a television series it sponsored. Variety described it as "the first industry admission of what has for some time been an open secret – that the threat of being labeled a political non-conformist, or worse, has been used against show business personalities, and that a screening system is at work determining these [actors'] availabilities for roles".

The Hollywood blacklist had long gone hand in hand with the Red-baiting activities of J. Edgar Hoover's FBI. Adversaries of HUAC such as lawyer Bartley Crum, who defended some of the Hollywood Ten in front of the committee in 1947, were labeled as Communist sympathizers or subversives and targeted for investigation themselves. Throughout the 1950s, the FBI tapped Crum's phones, opened his mail, and placed him under continuous surveillance. As a result, he lost most of his clients and, unable to cope with the stress of ceaseless harassment, committed suicide in 1959. Intimidating and dividing the left is now seen as a central purpose of the HUAC hearings. Fund-raising for once-popular humanitarian efforts became difficult, and despite the sympathies of many in the industry there was little open support in Hollywood for causes such as the Civil Rights Movement and opposition to nuclear weapons testing.

The struggles attending the blacklist were played out metaphorically on the big screen in various ways. As described by film historian James Chapman, "Carl Foreman, who had refused to testify before the committee, wrote the western High Noon (1952), in which a town marshal (played, ironically, by friendly witness Gary Cooper) finds himself deserted by the good citizens of Hadleyville (read: Hollywood) when a gang of outlaws who had terrorized the town several years earlier (read: HUAC) returns." Cooper's lawman cleaned up Hadleyville, but Foreman was forced to leave for Europe to find work. Meanwhile, Kazan and Schulberg collaborated on a movie widely seen as justifying their decision to name names. On the Waterfront (1954) became one of the most honored films in Hollywood history, winning eight Academy Awards, including Oscars for Best Film, Kazan's direction, and Schulberg's screenplay. The film featured Lee J. Cobb, one of the best known actors to name names. Time Out Film Guide argues that the film is "undermined" by its "embarrassing special pleading on behalf of informers".

After his release from prison, Herbert Biberman of the Hollywood Ten directed Salt of the Earth (also 1954), working independently in New Mexico with fellow blacklisted Hollywood professionals – producer Paul Jarrico, writer Michael Wilson, and actors Rosaura Revueltas and Will Geer. The film, concerning a strike by Mexican-American mine workers, was denounced as Communist propaganda when it was completed in 1953. Distributors boycotted it, newspapers and radio stations rejected advertisements for it, and the projectionists' union refused to run it. Nationwide in 1954, only around a dozen theaters exhibited it.

Break (1957–present)
Jules Dassin was one of the first to break the blacklist. Although he was named by Edward Dmytryk and Frank Tuttle in spring 1951, he directed in December 1952 the Broadway Play Two's Company with Bette Davis. In June 1956, his French film production Rififi opened at the Fine Arts Theater and stayed for 20 weeks.

A key figure in bringing an end to blacklisting was John Henry Faulk. Host of an afternoon comedy radio show, Faulk was a leftist active in his union, the American Federation of Television and Radio Artists. He was scrutinized by AWARE, Inc., one of the private firms that examined individuals for signs of Communist sympathies and "disloyalty". Marked by the group as unfit, he was fired by CBS Radio. Almost alone among the many victims of blacklisting, Faulk decided to sue AWARE in 1957. Though the case dragged through the courts for years, the suit itself was an important symbol of the building resistance to the blacklist.

The initial cracks in the entertainment industry blacklist were evident on television, specifically at CBS. In 1957, blacklisted actor Norman Lloyd was hired by Alfred Hitchcock as an associate producer for his anthology series Alfred Hitchcock Presents, then entering its third season on the network. On November 30, 1958, a live CBS production of Wonderful Town, based on short stories written by then-Communist Ruth McKenney, appeared with the proper writing credit of blacklisted Edward Chodorov, along with his literary partner, Joseph Fields. The following year, actress Betty Hutton insisted that blacklisted composer Jerry Fielding be hired as musical director for her new series, also on CBS. The first main break in the Hollywood blacklist followed soon after. On January 20, 1960, director Otto Preminger publicly announced that Dalton Trumbo, one of the best known members of the Hollywood Ten, was the screenwriter of his forthcoming film Exodus. Six and a half months later, with Exodus still to debut, The New York Times announced that Universal Pictures would give Trumbo screen credit for his role as writer on Spartacus, a decision now recognized as being largely made by star/producer Kirk Douglas. On October 6, Spartacus premiered – the first movie to bear Trumbo's name since he had received story credit on Emergency Wedding in 1950. Since 1947, he had written or co-written approximately seventeen motion pictures without credit. Exodus followed in December, also bearing Trumbo's name. The blacklist was now clearly coming to an end, but its effects continue to reverberate even until the present.

John Henry Faulk won his lawsuit in 1962. With this court decision, the private blacklisters and those who used them were put on notice that they were legally liable for the professional and financial damage they caused. This helped to bring an end to publications such as Counterattack. Like Adrian Scott and Lillian Hellman, however, a number of those on the blacklist remained there for an extended period – Lionel Stander, for instance, could not find work in Hollywood until 1965. Some of those who named names, like Kazan and Schulberg, argued for years after that they had made an ethically proper decision. Others, like actor Lee J. Cobb and director Michael Gordon, who gave friendly testimony to HUAC after suffering on the blacklist for a time, "concede[d] with remorse that their plan was to name their way back to work". Others were haunted by the choice they had made. In 1963, actor Sterling Hayden declared,
I was a rat, a stoolie, and the names I named of those close friends were blacklisted and deprived of their livelihood.
Scholars Paul Buhle and Dave Wagner state that Hayden "was widely believed to have drunk himself into a near-suicidal depression decades before his 1986 death".

Into the 21st century, the Writers Guild pursued the correction of screen credits from movies of the 1950s and early 1960s to properly reflect the work of blacklisted writers such as Carl Foreman and Hugo Butler. On December 19, 2011, the guild, acting on a request for an investigation made by his dying son Christopher Trumbo, announced that Dalton Trumbo would get full credit for his work on the screenplay for the romantic comedy Roman Holiday (1953), almost sixty years after the fact.

Blacklisted

The Hollywood Ten

The following ten individuals were cited for contempt of Congress and blacklisted after refusing to answer questions about their alleged involvement with the Communist Party:
Alvah Bessie, screenwriter
Herbert Biberman, screenwriter and director
Lester Cole, screenwriter
Edward Dmytryk, director
Ring Lardner Jr., screenwriter
John Howard Lawson, screenwriter
Albert Maltz, screenwriter
Samuel Ornitz, screenwriter
Adrian Scott, producer and screenwriter
Dalton Trumbo, screenwriter
In late September 1947, HUAC subpoenaed 79 individuals on a claim that they were subversive and the supposition that they injected Communist propaganda into their films. Although never substantiating this claim, the investigators charged them with contempt of Congress when they refused to answer the questions about their membership in the Screen Writers Guild and Communist Party. The Committee demanded they admit their political beliefs and name names of other Communists. Nineteen of those refused to co-operate, and due to illnesses, scheduling conflicts, and exhaustion from the chaotic hearings, only 10 appeared before the Committee. These men became known as the Hollywood Ten.

Belonging to the Communist Party did not constitute a crime, and the Committee's right to investigate these men was questionable in the first place. These men relied on the First Amendment's right to privacy, freedom of speech, and freedom of thought, but the Committee charged them with contempt of Congress for refusing to answer questions. Later defendants – except Pete Seeger – tried different strategies.

Acknowledging the potential for punishment, the Ten resisted the authority of HUAC. They yelled at the Chairman and treated the Committee with open indignation, emanating negativity and discouraging outside public favor and help. Upon receiving their contempt citations, they believed the Supreme Court would overturn the rulings, which did not turn out to be the case, and as a result, they were convicted of contempt and fined $1,000 each (or, over $10,700 USD in 2016 dollars, when adjusted for inflation), and sentenced to six-months to one-year prison terms.

Martin Redish suggests that, at this time, the First Amendment's right of free expression in these cases was used to protect the powers of the government accusers instead of the rights of the citizen-victims. After witnessing the well-publicized ineffectiveness of the Ten's defense strategy, later defendants chose to plead the Fifth Amendment (against self-incrimination), instead.

Public support for the Hollywood Ten wavered, as everyday citizen-observers were never really sure what to make of them. Some of these men later wrote about their experiences as part of the Ten. John Howard Lawson, the Ten's unofficial leader, wrote a book attacking Hollywood for appeasing HUAC. While mostly criticizing the studios for their weakness, Lawson also defends himself/the Ten and criticizes Edward Dmytryk for being the only one to recant and eventually co-operate with HUAC.

In his 1981 autobiography, Hollywood Red, screenwriter Lester Cole stated that all of the Hollywood Ten had been Communist Party USA members at some point. Other members of the Hollywood Ten, such as Dalton Trumbo and Edward Dmytryk, publicly admitted to being Communists while testifying before the Committee.

When Dmytryk wrote his memoir about this period, he denounced the Ten, and defended his decision to work with HUAC. He claimed to have left the Communist Party before having been subpoenaed, defining himself as the "odd man out". He condemned the Ten's legal tactic of defiance, and regretted staying with the group for as long as he did.

Others in 1947

Hanns Eisler, composer
Bernard Gordon, screenwriter
Joan LaCour Scott, screenwriter
Irving Lerner, editor and director

Between January 1948 and June 1950
(an asterisk after the entry indicates the person was also listed in Red Channels)
Ben Barzman, screenwriter
Paul Draper, actor and dancer*
Sheridan Gibney, screenwriter
Paul Green, playwright and screenwriter
Lillian Hellman, playwright and screenwriter*
Canada Lee, actor
Paul Robeson, actor and singer
Edwin Rolfe, screenwriter and poet
William Sweets, radio personality*
Richard Wright, writer

Red Channels list
(see, e. g., Schrecker [2002], p. 244; Barnouw [1990], pp. 122–124)

Larry Adler, actor and musician
Luther Adler, actor and director
Stella Adler, actress and teacher
Edith Atwater, actress
Howard Bay, scenic designer
Ralph Bell, actor
Leonard Bernstein, composer and conductor
Walter Bernstein, screenwriter, mentioned in Venona intercepts of Soviet Agents
Marc Blitzstein, composer
Millen Brand, writer
Oscar Brand, folk singer
Joseph Edward Bromberg, actor
Himan Brown, producer and director
John Brown, actor
Abe Burrows, playwright and lyricist
Morris Carnovsky, actor
Cliff Carpenter, actor
Vera Caspary, writer
Edward Chodorov, screenwriter and producer
Jerome Chodorov, writer
Mady Christians, actress
Lee J. Cobb, actor
Marc Connelly, playwright
Aaron Copland, composer
Norman Corwin, writer
Howard Da Silva, actor
Roger De Koven, actor
Dean Dixon, conductor
Olin Downes, music critic
Alfred Drake, actor and singer
Paul Draper, actor and dancer
Howard Duff, actor
Clifford J. Durr, attorney
Richard Dyer-Bennet, folk singer
José Ferrer, actor
Louise Fitch (Lewis), actress
Martin Gabel, actor
Arthur Gaeth, radio commentator
William S. Gailmor, journalist and radio commentator
John Garfield, actor
Will Geer, actor
Jack Gilford, actor and comedian
Tom Glazer, folk singer
Ruth Gordon, actress and screenwriter
Lloyd Gough, actor
Morton Gould, pianist and composer
Shirley Graham, writer
Ben Grauer, radio and TV personality
Mitchell Grayson, radio producer and director
Horace Grenell, conductor and music producer
Uta Hagen, actress and teacher
Dashiell Hammett, writer
E. Y. "Yip" Harburg, lyricist
Robert P. Heller, television journalist
Lillian Hellman, playwright and screenwriter
Jon Hering, intern
Nat Hiken, writer and producer
Rose Hobart, actress
Judy Holliday, actress and comedian
Roderick B. Holmgren, journalist
Lena Horne, singer and actress
Langston Hughes, writer
Marsha Hunt, actress
Leo Hurwitz, director
Charles Irving, actor
Burl Ives, folk singer and actor
Sam Jaffe, actor
Leon Janney, actor
Joe Julian, actor
Garson Kanin, writer and director
George Keane, actor
Donna Keath, radio actress
Pert Kelton, actress
Alexander Kendrick, journalist and author
Adelaide Klein, actress
Howard Koch, screenwriter
Tony Kraber, actor
Millard Lampell, screenwriter
John La Touche, lyricist
Arthur Laurents, writer
Gypsy Rose Lee, actress and ecdysiast
Madeline Lee, actress
Ray Lev, classical pianist
Philip Loeb, actor
Ella Logan, actress and singer
Alan Lomax, folklorist and musicologist
Avon Long, actor and singer
Joseph Losey, director
Peter Lyon, television writer
Aline MacMahon, actress
Paul Mann, director and teacher
Margo, actress and dancer
Myron McCormick, actor
Paul McGrath, radio actor
Burgess Meredith, actor
Arthur Miller, playwright
Henry Morgan, actor
Zero Mostel, actor and comedian
Jean Muir, actress
Meg Mundy, actress
Lyn Murray, composer and choral director
Ben Myers, attorney
Dorothy Parker, screenwriter
Arnold Perl, producer and writer
Minerva Pious, actress
Samson Raphaelson, screenwriter and playwright
Bernard Reis, accountant
Anne Revere, actress
Kenneth Roberts, writer
Earl Robinson, composer and lyricist
Edward G. Robinson, actor
William N. Robson, radio and TV writer
Harold Rome, composer and lyricist
Norman Rosten, writer
Selena Royle, actress
Coby Ruskin, TV director
Robert William St. John, journalist, broadcaster
Hazel Scott, jazz and classical musician
Pete Seeger, folk singer
Lisa Sergio, radio personality
Artie Shaw, jazz musician
Irwin Shaw, writer, playwright
Robert Lewis Shayon, former president of radio and TV directors' guild
Ann Shepherd, actress
William L. Shirer, journalist, broadcaster
Allan Sloane, radio and TV writer
Howard K. Smith, journalist, broadcaster
Gale Sondergaard, actress
Hester Sondergaard, actress
Lionel Stander, actor
Johannes Steele, journalist, radio commentator
Paul Stewart, actor
Elliott Sullivan, actor
William Sweets, radio personality
Helen Tamiris, choreographer
Betty Todd, director
Louis Untermeyer, poet
Hilda Vaughn, actress
J. Raymond Walsh, radio commentator
Sam Wanamaker, actor
Theodore Ward, playwright
Fredi Washington, actor
Margaret Webster, actress, director and producer
Orson Welles, actor, writer and director
Josh White, blues musician
Irene Wicker, singer and actress
Betty Winkler (Keane), actress
Martin Wolfson, actor
Lesley Woods, actor
Richard Yaffe, journalist, broadcaster

After June 1950

Eddie Albert, actor
Lew Amster, screenwriter
Richard Attenborough, actor, director and producer
Norma Barzman, screenwriter
Sol Barzman, screenwriter
Orson Bean, actor
Albert Bein, screenwriter
Harry Belafonte, actor and singer
Barbara Bel Geddes, actress
Ben Bengal, screenwriter
Seymour Bennett, screenwriter
Leonardo Bercovici, screenwriter
Herschel Bernardi, actor
John Berry, actor, screenwriter and director
Henry Blankfort, screenwriter
Laurie Blankfort, artist
Roman Bohnen, actor
Allen Boretz, screenwriter and songwriter
Phoebe Brand, actress
John Bright, screenwriter
Phil Brown, actor
Harold Buchman, screenwriter
Sidney Buchman, screenwriter
Luis Buñuel, director
Val Burton, screenwriter
Hugo Butler, screenwriter
Alan Campbell, screenwriter
Charlie Chaplin, actor, director and producer
Maurice Clark, screenwriter
Richard Collins, screenwriter
Charles Collingwood, radio commentator
Dorothy Comingore, actress
Jeff Corey, actor
George Corey, screenwriter
Irwin Corey, actor and comedian
Oliver Crawford, screenwriter
John Cromwell, director
Charles Dagget, animator
Danny Dare, choreographer
Jules Dassin, director
Ossie Davis, actor
Ruby Dee, actress
Dolores del Río, actress
Karen DeWolf, screenwriter
Howard Dimsdale, writer
Ludwig Donath, actor
Arnaud d'Usseau, screenwriter
Phil Eastman, cartoon writer
Leslie Edgley, screenwriter
Edward Eliscu, screenwriter
Faith Elliott, animator
Cy Endfield, screenwriter and director
Guy Endore, screenwriter
Francis Edward Faragoh, screenwriter
Frances Farmer, actress
Howard Fast, writer
John Henry Faulk, radio personality
Jerry Fielding, composer
Carl Foreman, producer and screenwriter
Anne Froelick, screenwriter
Lester Fuller, director
Bert Gilden, screenwriter
Lee Gold, screenwriter
Harold Goldman, screenwriter
Michael Gordon, director
Jay Gorney, screenwriter
Lee Grant, actress
Morton Grant, screenwriter
Anne Green, screenwriter
Jack T. Gross, producer
Margaret Gruen, screenwriter
David Hilberman, animator
Tamara Hovey, screenwriter
John Hubley, animator
Edward Huebsch, screenwriter
Ian McLellan Hunter, screenwriter
Kim Hunter, actress
John Ireland, actor
Daniel James, screenwriter
Paul Jarrico, producer and screenwriter
Gordon Kahn, screenwriter
Victor Kilian, actor
Sidney Kingsley, playwright
Alexander Knox, actor
Mickey Knox, actor
Lester Koenig, film/record producer
Charles Korvin, actor
Hy Kraft, screenwriter
Constance Lee, screenwriter
Will Lee, actor and comic
Robert Lees, screenwriter
Carl Lerner, editor and director
Irving Lerner, director
Sam Levene, actor
Lewis Leverett, actor
Alfred Lewis Levitt, screenwriter
Helen Slote Levitt, screenwriter
Mitch Lindemann, screenwriter
Norman Lloyd, actor
Ben Maddow, screenwriter
Arnold Manoff, screenwriter
John McGrew, animator
Ruth McKenney, writer
Bill Melendez, animator
John "Skins" Miller, actor
Paula Miller (actress), actress
Josef Mischel, screenwriter
Karen Morley, actress
Henry Myers, screenwriter
Mortimer Offner, screenwriter
Alfred Palca, writer and producer
Larry Parks, actor
Leo Penn, actor
George Pepper (film producer)
Jeanette Pepper, economist 
Irving Pichel, director
Louis Pollock, screenwriter
Abraham Polonsky, screenwriter and director
William Pomerance, animation executive
Vladimir Pozner, screenwriter
Stanley Prager, director
John Randolph, actor
Maurice Rapf, screenwriter
Rosaura Revueltas, actress
Robert L. Richards, screenwriter
Frederic I. Rinaldo, screenwriter
Martin Ritt, actor and director
W. L. River, screenwriter
Marguerite Roberts, screenwriter
David Robison, screenwriter
Naomi Robison, actress
Louise Rousseau, screenwriter
Jean Rouverol (Butler), actress and writer
Shimen Ruskin, actor
Madeleine Ruthven, screenwriter
Waldo Salt, screenwriter
John Sanford, screenwriter
Bill Scott, voice actor and producer
Martha Scott, actress
Robert Shayne, actor
Joshua Shelley, actor
Madeleine Sherwood, actress
Reuben Ship, screenwriter
Viola Brothers Shore, screenwriter
Hilda Simms, actress
George Sklar, playwright
Art Smith, actor
Louis Solomon, screenwriter and producer
Ray Spencer, screenwriter
Janet Stevenson, writer
Philip Stevenson, writer
Donald Ogden Stewart, screenwriter
Arthur Strawn, screenwriter
Bess Taffel, screenwriter
Julius Tannenbaum, producer
Frank Tarloff, screenwriter
Shepard Traube, director and screenwriter
Dorothy Tree, actress
Paul Trivers, screenwriter
George Tyne, actor
Michael Uris, writer
Peter Viertel, screenwriter
Bernard Vorhaus, director
John Weber, producer
Richard Weil, screenwriter
Hannah Weinstein, producer
John Wexley, screenwriter
Michael Wilson, screenwriter
Nedrick Young, actor and screenwriter
Julian Zimet, screenwriter

See also
 Joseph McCarthy

References
Informational notes

 The following transcript of an excerpt from the interrogation of screenwriter John Howard Lawson by HUAC chairman J. Parnell Thomas gives an example of the tenor of some of the exchanges:

Thomas: Are you a member of the Communist Party or have you ever been a member of the Communist Party?
Lawson: It's unfortunate and tragic that I have to teach this committee the basic principles of Americanism.
Thomas: That's not the question. That's not the question. The question is – have you ever been a member of the Communist Party?
Lawson: I am framing my answer in the only way in which any American citizen can frame his answer to ... 
Thomas: Then you deny it?
Lawson: ... a question that invades his ... absolutely invades his privacy.
Thomas: Then you deny ... You refuse to answer that question, is that correct?
Lawson: I have told you that I will offer my beliefs, my affiliations and everything else to the American public and they will know where I stand as they do from what I have written.
Thomas: Stand away from the stand ... 
Lawson: I have written for Americanism for many years ... 
Thomas: Stand away from the stand ... 
Lawson: And I shall continue to fight for the Bill of Rights, which you are trying to destroy.
Thomas: Officer, take this man away from the stand.
 At least a couple of recent histories incorrectly give December 3 as the date of the Waldorf Statement: Ross (2002), p. 217; Stone (2004), p. 365. Among the many 1947 sources that establish the correct date, there is the New York Times article "Movies to Oust Ten Cited For Contempt of Congress; Major Companies Also Vote to Refuse Jobs to Communists – 'Hysteria, Surrender of Freedom' Charged by Defense Counsel; Movies Will Oust Ten Men Cited for Contempt of Congress After Voting to Refuse Employment to Communists", which appeared on the front page of the newspaper November 26.
 Blankfort gave co-operative, if uninformative, testimony to HUAC and was not blacklisted.
 Madeline Lee – who was married to actor Jack Gilford, also listed by Red Channels – was frequently confused with another actress of the era named Madaline Lee.
 Four months after refusing to co-operate with HUAC, Dagget appeared again before the committee and named names.
 In 1951, Dare appeared before HUAC, lied about having never been a Communist, and continued to work in the entertainment industry. He was blacklisted two years later for his involvement in Meet the People, a 1939 theatrical production. Soon afterward, he recanted his earlier testimony and named names.

Citations

Bibliography

Anderson, John (2007). "Old Hollywood", Village Voice, November 20 (available online).
Andrew, Geoff (2005). "On the Waterfront", in Time Out Film Guide, 14th ed., ed. John Pym. London: Time Out. 
Barnouw, Erik (1990 [1975]). Tube of Plenty: The Evolution of American Television. New York and Oxford: Oxford University Press. 
Barzman, Norma (2004). The Red And The Blacklist: The Intimate Memoir of a Hollywood Expatriate. New York: Thunder's Mouth/Nation Books. 
Belton, John (1994). American Cinema/American Culture [excerpt] in Ross (2002), pp. 193–212.
Billingsley, Kenneth Lloyd (2000). Hollywood Party. Roseville, CA: Prima Publishing. .
Bogart, Humphrey (1948). "I'm No Communist", Photoplay, March (available online).
Bosworth, Patricia (1997). Anything Your Little Heart Desires: An American Family Story. New York: Simon and Schuster. 
Boyer, Edward J. (1996). "Danny Dare, 91; Blacklisted Choreographer, Dancer", Los Angeles Times, November 30 (available online).
Brown, Jared (1989) Zero Mostel: A Biography, New York: Athenium. .
Buhle, Paul, and David Wagner (2003a). Hide in Plain Sight: The Hollywood Blacklistees in Film and Television, 1950–2002. New York: Palgrave Macmillan. 
Buhle, Paul, and David Wagner (2003b). Blacklisted: The Film Lover's Guide to the Hollywood Blacklist. New York: Palgrave Macmillan. 
Burlingame, Jon (2000). Sound and Vision: 60 Years of Motion Picture Soundtracks. New York: Billboard/Watson-Guptill. 
Ceplair, Larry, and Steven Englund (2003). The Inquisition in Hollywood: Politics in the Film Community, 1930–1960. Urbana and Chicago: University of Illinois Press. 
Chapman, James (2003). Cinemas of the World: Film and Society from 1895 to the Present. London: Reaktion. 
Charity, Tom (2005). "Storm Center", in Time Out Film Guide, 14th ed., ed. John Pym. London: Time Out. 
Christensen, Terry and Peter J. Haas (2005). Projecting Politics: Political Messages in American Films. Armonk, N.Y., and London: M.E. Sharpe. 
Cogley, John (1956). "Report on Blacklisting." Collected in Blacklisting: An Original Anthology (1971), Merle Miller and John Cogley. New York: Arno Press/New York Times. 
Cohen, Karl F. (2004 [1997]). Forbidden Animation: Censored Cartoons and Blacklisted Animators in America. Jefferson, N.C.: McFarland. 
Cook, Fred J. (1971). The Nightmare Decade: The Life and Times of Senator Joe McCarthy. New York: Random House. 
Denning, Michael (1998). The Cultural Front: The Laboring of American Culture in the Twentieth Century. London and New York: Verso. 
Dick, Bernard F. (1982). Hellman in Hollywood. East Brunswick, N.J., London, and Toronto: Associated University Presses. 
Dick, Bernard F. (1989). Radical Innocence: A Critical Study of the Hollywood Ten. Lexington: University Press of Kentucky. 
Doherty, Thomas (2003). Cold War, Cool Medium: Television, McCarthyism, and American Culture. New York: Columbia University Press. 
Everitt, David (2007). A Shadow of Red: Communism and the Blacklist in Radio and Television. Chicago: Ivan R. Dee. 
Faulk, John Henry (1963). Fear on Trial. Austin: University of Texas Press. 
Fried, Albert (1997). McCarthyism, The Great American Red Scare: A Documentary History. New York and Oxford: Oxford University Press. 
Gevinson, Alan (ed.) (1997). American Film Institute Catalog – Within Our Gates: Ethnicity in American Feature Films, 1911–1960. Berkeley, Los Angeles, and London: University of California Press. 
Gill, Glenda Eloise (2000). No Surrender! No Retreat!: African-American Pioneer Performers of 20th Century American Theater. New York: Palgrave. 
Goldfield, Michael (2004). "Communist Party", in Poverty in the United States: An Encyclopedia of History, Politics, and Policy, ed. Gwendolyn Mink and Alice O'Connor. Santa Barbara, Calif.: ABC-CLIO. 
Goldstein, Patrick (1999). "Many Refuse to Clap as Kazan Receives Oscar", Los Angeles Times, March 22 (available online).
Gordon, Bernard (1999). Hollywood Exile, Or How I Learned to Love the Blacklist. Austin: University of Texas Press. 
Goudsouzian, Aram (2004). Sidney Poitier: Man, Actor, Icon. Chapel Hill and London: University of North Carolina Press. 
Graulich, Melody, and Stephen Tatum (2003). Reading The Virginian in the New West. Lincoln: University of Nebraska Press. 
Herman, Jan (1997 [1995]). A Talent for Trouble: The Life of Hollywood's Most Acclaimed Director, William Wyler. Cambridge, Massachusetts: Da Capo. 
Horne, Gerald (2006). The Final Victim of the Blacklist: John Howard Lawson, Dean of the Hollywood Ten. Berkeley, Los Angeles, and London: University of California Press. 
Jablonski, Edward (1998 [1988]). Gershwin. Cambridge, Massachusetts: Da Capo. 
Johnpoll, Bernard K. (1994). A Documentary History of the Communist Party of the United States, vol. 3. Westport, Conn.: Greenwood. 
Katz, Ephraim (1994). The Film Encyclopedia, 2d ed. New York: HarperPerennial. 
Kisseloff, Jeff (1995). The Box: An Oral History of Television, 1920–1961. New York: Viking. 
Korvin, Charles (1997). "Actors Suffered, Too" [letter to the editor], New York Times, May 4 (available online).
Lasky, Betty (1989). RKO: The Biggest Little Major of Them All. Santa Monica, California: Roundtable. 
Lerner, Gerda (2003). Fireweed: A Political Autobiography. Philadelphia: Temple University Press. 
Lumenick, Lou (2007a). "Father's Footsteps", New York Post, February 22 (available online).
Lumenick, Lou (2007b). "Ask the Old Pro", New York Post, November 23 (available online).
McGill, Lisa D. (2005). Constructing Black Selves: Caribbean American Narratives and the Second Generation. New York and London: New York University Press. 
Murphy, Brenda (2003). Congressional Theatre: Dramatizing McCarthyism on Stage, Film, and Television. Cambridge: Cambridge University Press. 
Navasky, Victor S. (1980). Naming Names. New York: Viking. 
Nelson, Cary, and Jefferson Hendricks (1990). Edwin Rolfe: A Biographical Essay and Guide to the Rolfe Archive at the University of Illinois at Urbana-Champaign. Urbana: University of Illinois Press. 
Newman, Robert P. (1989). The Cold War Romance of Lillian Hellman and John Melby. Chapel Hill and London: University of North Carolina Press. 
O'Neill, William L. (1990 [1982]). A Better World: Stalinism and the American Intellectuals. New Brunswick, N.J.: Transaction. 
Parish, James Robert (2004). The Hollywood Book of Scandals: The Shocking, Often Disgraceful Deeds and Affairs of More than 100 American Movie and TV Idols. New York et al.: McGraw-Hill. 
Perebinossoff, Philippe, Brian Gross, and Lynne S. Gross (2005). Programming for TV, Radio, and the Internet: Strategy, Development, and Evaluation. Burlington, Mass., and Oxford: Focal Press/Elsiver. 
Ramón, David (1997). Dolores del Río. México: Clío. 
Red Channels: The Report of Communist Influence in Radio and Television (1950). New York: Counterattack.
Ross, Stephen J. (ed.) (2002). Movies and American Society. Malden, Mass., and Oxford: Blackwell. 
Schrecker, Ellen (2002). The Age of McCarthyism: A Brief History with Documents. New York: Palgrave. 
Schwartz, Jerry (1999). "Some Actors Outraged by Kazan Honor", Associated Press, March 13 (available online).
Scott, William Berryman, and Peter M. Rutkoff (1999). New York Modern: The Arts and the City. Baltimore: Johns Hopkins University Press. 
Smith, Jeff (1999). "'A Good Business Proposition': Dalton Trumbo, Spartacus, and the End of the Blacklist", in Controlling Hollywood: Censorship/Regulation in the Studio Era, ed. Matthew Bernstein. New Brunswick, N.J.: Rutgers University Press. 
Stone, Geoffrey R. (2004). Perilous Times: Free Speech in Wartime from the Sedition Act of 1798 to the War on Terrorism. New York: W. W. Norton. 
Sullivan, James (2010). Seven Dirty Words: The Life and Crimes of George Carlin. Cambridge, Massachusetts: Da Capo Press. 
Trumbo, Dalton (1970). Additional Dialogue: Letters of Dalton Trumbo 1942–1962. Manfull, Helen, ed. New York: Evans and Company. ISBN
"Oliver Crawford: Hollywood Writer", Times (London), October 8, 2008 (available online).
Verrier, Richard (2011). "Writers Guild Restores Screenplay Credit to Trumbo for 'Roman Holiday'", Los Angeles Times, December 19 (available online).
Wakeman, John, ed. (1987). World Film Directors-Volume One: 1890–1945. New York: H. W. Wilson. 
Ward, Brian (1998). Just My Soul Responding: Rhythm and Blues, Black Consciousness, and Race Relations. London: UCL Press. 
Ward, Jerry Washington, and Robert Butler (2008). The Richard Wright Encyclopedia. Westport, Conn.: Greenwood. 
Weigand, Kate (2002). Red Feminism: American Communism and the Making of Women's Liberation. Baltimore and London: Johns Hopkins University Press. 
Weinraub, Bernard (2000). "Blacklisted Screenwriters Get Credits", New York Times, August 5.
Zecker, Robert (2007). Metropolis: The American City in Popular Culture. Westport, Conn.: Greenwood. 

Further reading
Berg, Sandra (2006). "When Noir Turned Black" (interview with Jules Dassin), Written By (November) (available online Archived version of May 2013).
Bernstein, Walter (2000). Inside Out: A Memoir of the Blacklist. New York: Da Capo. 
Briley, Ronald (1994). "Reel History and the Cold War", OAH Magazine of History 8 (winter) (available online Archived version of Jan.2003).
 Caballero, Raymond. McCarthyism vs. Clinton Jencks. Norman: University of Oklahoma Press, 2019.
Georgakas, Dan (1992). "Hollywood Blacklist", in Encyclopedia of the American Left, ed. Mari Jo Buhle, Paul Buhle, and Dan Georgakas. Urbana and Chicago: University of Illinois Press (available online). 
Kahn, Gordon (1948). Hollywood on Trial: The Story of the 10 Who Were Indicted. New York: Boni & Gaer (excerpted online). 
Leab, Daniel J., with guide by Robert E. Lester (1991). Communist Activity in the Entertainment Industry: FBI Surveillance Files on Hollywood, 1942–1958. Bethesda, Maryland: University Publications of America (available online). 
Murray, Lawrence L. (1975). "Monsters, Spys, and Subversives: The Film Industry Responds to the Cold War, 1945–1955", Jump Cut 9 (available online).
Nizer, Louis. (1966). The Jury Returns. New York: Doubleday & Co. 
"Seven-Year Justice", Time, July 6, 1962 (available online).
Vaughn, Robert. (2004). Only Victims: A Study of Show Business Blacklisting, 2nd ed. New York: Proscenium/Limelight Editions. (Originally published New York: Putnam, 1972).

External links
Albert Maltz's HUAC Testimony transcript of the writer's testimony (preceded by excerpts of actor Ronald Reagan's testimony – see below for link to complete Reagan transcript)
"Congressional Committees and Unfriendly Witnesses" detailed examination of legal issues involved in HUAC proceedings by historian Ellen Schrecker
"McCarthy Era Blacklist Victims, Peace Groups, Academics, and Media File Amicus Briefs in CCR Case" news release focused on 2009 brief filed by former blacklistees including Irwin Corey in Holder v. Humanitarian Law Project Supreme Court free speech case
Ronald Reagan's HUAC Testimony transcript of the actor's testimony of October 23, 1947 (Archived version of Nov. 2004)
"Seeing Red" transcript of excerpts from PBS documentary The Legacy of the Hollywood Blacklist and interview by NewsHour correspondent Elizabeth Farnsworth with two blacklisted artists, writer/producer Paul Jarrico and actress Marsha Hunt
FBI Documents on Communist Infiltration – Motion Picture Industry (COMPIC)
Hollywood Blacklist, series of interviews and transcripts (many online) from Center for Oral History Research, UCLA Library Special Collections, University of California, Los Angeles.

 
History of Hollywood, Los Angeles
History of film
McCarthyism
Political and cultural purges
Political repression in the United States
Cinema of Southern California
Cinema of the United States
Film and video terminology
1940s in American cinema
1950s in American cinema
Anti-communism in the United States